Hans Belting (7 July 1935 – 10 January 2023) was a German art historian and theorist of medieval and Renaissance art, as well as contemporary art and image theory.

Biography 
Belting was born in Andernach, Rhine Province, on 7 July 1935. He studied at the universities of Mainz and Rome, and took his doctorate in art history at the University of Mainz. Belting taught as a professor of art history at the University of Hamburg in 1966, then at the University of Heidelberg, and from 1980 to 1992 at the Ludwig-Maximilians-Universität at Munich.

From 1992 until his retirement in 2002, Belting was professor at the Institute for Art History and Media Theory at the State College of Design in Karlsruhe. From October 2004 until the end of September 2007, Belting served as Director of the Internationales Forschungszentrum Kulturwissenschaften (International Research Centre for Cultural Studies) in Vienna.

Belting published his first monograph in 1962 (Die Basilica dei Ss. Martiri in Cimitile) and later authored more than thirty books, some of them translated into various languages. His essay "The End of Art History?" attracted considerable attention and Belting expanded it in successive editions.

Belting died in Berlin on 10 January 2023, at age 87.

Writings 
Belting was known for his contributions to the field of Bildwissenschaft ("image-science"). His account of Bildwissenschaft sought to develop an anthropological theory of the image to examine its universal functions that span cultural distinctions, and considered the relationship between the image and the body. Belting examined images used in religious contexts to identify the original non-artistic functions of images today considered art objects, and argued that "art" was a unit of analysis had emerged in the 16th century that obstructed corporeal engagements with images.

In Likeness and Presence (1990), Belting argued for the necessity of understanding the ways images give meaning to their contexts, rather than gaining meaning from their contexts, to understand images as actors with their own agency. Belting argued that art history as a disciplinary formation was outmoded and potentially obsolete, and that a Bildwissenschaft capable of apprehending all kinds of images, the exact scope and methods of which remain uncertain, should be sought. Pioneering the development of a global perspective on art studies and museum practice was the research project GAM – Global Art and the Museum, which Belting initiated in 2006 with Peter Weibel and Andrea Buddensieg at the ZKM Center for Art and Media Karlsruhe. The project, which ran until 2016, took a look at new museum practices and the worldwide development of art biennials that have emerged beyond "Euramerica" (John Clark) since the end of the 1980s. The project included the exhibition and publication The Global Contemporary: Art Worlds after 1989 (2011–2012) at ZKM | Center or Art and Media Karlsruhe.

Fellowships and honours 

Belting was a member of scientific academies in Germany and the U.S., including the Heidelberg Academy of Sciences, a fellow of the Wissenschaftskolleg in Berlin, and honorary member of the Zentrum für Literatur- und Kulturforschung Berlin (since 2006). He was a member of the Order pour le Mérite of Arts and Sciences and a member of the Board of Trustees of the Museum of Modern Art Ludwig Foundation Vienna (MUMOK). He was elected a Foreign Honorary Member of the American Academy of Arts and Sciences in 1992, and a member of the American Philosophical Society in 2005. He held a fellowship at Dumbarton Oaks of Harvard University in Washington, D.C.

In 2016 Belting donated his private library in three parts to the libraries of the institutes of art history at Free University of Berlin, at Danube University Krems (Austria) as well as the Department of Art History of the Faculty of Arts of Masaryk University. Hence the last named the new library after him.

Select works

References

External links 

 "Why the Museum? New Markets, Colonial Memories, and Local Politics", Keynote Lecture at the ZKM conference, 19 October 2007
 Dictionary of Art Historians: Belting, Hans
 Chicago School of Media
 Northwestern University – Faculty
 Complete list of works

1935 births
2023 deaths
Academic staff of Heidelberg University
Academic staff of the Ludwig Maximilian University of Munich
Academic staff of the University of Hamburg
Corresponding Fellows of the Medieval Academy of America
Fellows of the American Academy of Arts and Sciences
German art historians
German contemporary artists
German male non-fiction writers
Harvard University people
Historians of Byzantine art
Johannes Gutenberg University Mainz alumni
Knights Commander of the Order of Merit of the Federal Republic of Germany
Members of the American Philosophical Society
People from Andernach
People from the Rhine Province
Recipients of the Pour le Mérite (civil class)